The Fletcher Hercules is an American two-seat ultralight trike that was designed by AW Harrison and produced by Fletcher's Ultralights of Turlock, California, in the late 1990s and early 2000s. The aircraft was supplied as a kit for amateur construction and was also available as a completed aircraft.

Design and development
The Hercules was designed as a lightweight single-seat aircraft, with a second seat available to carry an instructor or passenger when required. Because it was intended to be flown solo most of the time it came factory-supplied with a relatively low powered engine, to reduce both the aircraft's cost and weight. Higher powered engines were available if the aircraft was to be used in the training role on a regular basis.

In writing about the Hercules, reviewer Andre Cliche explained the engine choice, "Because most people usually fly alone in their two-seater, it makes for a well balanced single seater with peppy performance, low fuel burn and longer range. However, when comes the time to carry an occasional passenger, its two-seater capacity far outweighs its anemic performance with two people aboard. This is a smart compromise that gives the best of both worlds."

It features a cable-braced hang glider-style high-wing, weight-shift controls, a two-seats-in-tandem open cockpit, tricycle landing gear and a single engine in pusher configuration.

The aircraft is made from bolted-together aluminum tubing, with its single surface wing covered in Dacron sailcloth. Its  span wing is supported by a single tube-type kingpost and uses an "A" frame control bar.

The standard engine supplied was the twin cylinder two-stroke  2si 460-F35, with the  Rotax 503 or the  Rotax 582 engines available as options. Other engines used include the  Cuyuna UL II-02,  Rotax 447,  Rotax 618 and the four-stroke  HKS 700E.

Due to its off-airport capabilities the Hercules was nicknamed "the jeep of trikes". It is noted for its ease of set-up and repair. Twenty-five had been completed and flown by February 2000.

Variants
Hercules Cruiser
Version marketed circa 1998 with  Cuyuna UL II-02 engine
Hercules Cross Country
Version marketed circa 1998 with  Rotax 503 engine

Specifications (version)

References

1990s United States ultralight aircraft
Homebuilt aircraft
Single-engined pusher aircraft